Billy Costello may refer to:

 Billy Costello (actor) (1898–1971), American actor
 Billy Costello (boxer) (1956–2011), American boxer